Olo or OLO may refer to:

Geography
Olo, South Sudan, a town in South Sudan
Olo language, a language of Papua New Guinea

People
Olo, Ale the Strong, a mythological king of Sweden
Audovald and Olo, two generals in the Frankish campaign against the Lombards under kings Guntram and Childebert II

Business
Olo (online ordering), a United States online food ordering company
On Line Opinion, an online journal in Australia
Olo (restaurant), a Michelin starred restaurant in Helsinki, Finland

Other
Ontario L'Orignal Railway
Olo n:o 22, an outdoor sculpture in Helsinki
Olos (album)
 OLOS (obstructed-line-of-sight), see Non-line-of-sight propagation

Abbreviations and codes
OLO, (fr)/Lineaire Obligatie, which is the most common kind of Belgian sovereign bond 
OLO, Ohio Light Opera, an opera company in Ohio, USA
Opera Lyra Ottawa, an opera company in Ontario, Canada
Livvi-Karelian language, which is denoted as "olo" in the ISO 639 3 language codes
Oslo Laptop Orchestra (OLO)
OLO, UCI team code for Omega Pharma–Lotto, a cycling team
The Official Languages Ordinance (Cap. 5) of Hong Kong